Žvabovo (in older sources also Švabovo) is a small settlement west of Šmarje in the Municipality of Šentjernej in southeastern Slovenia. The entire municipality is part of the traditional region of Lower Carniola and is now included in the Southeast Slovenia Statistical Region.

References

External links
Žvabovo on Geopedia

Populated places in the Municipality of Šentjernej